Nikolay Ivanovich Bogdanov (28 August 1751 - 16 March 1829) was a Russian General who participated in the wars against Napoleonic France. He received numerous awards and decorations for his work and with his experience also later fought the Ottoman Turks. In the Napoleonic Wars, he took part in the hard-fought Battle of Borodino.

Biography
Nikola Ivanovich Bogdanov's origins are from the ranks of Serbian nobility in Slavo-Serbia. On 27 March 1795, Bogdanov was awarded the Order of St. George, 4th degree "For the zealous service and brave deeds rendered during the defeat of the Polish insurgents" in the Vilnius uprising and during the storming of the city's fortifications, where he, commanding the guns entrusted to him on the 8th through the 31st of July 1794 contributed to the Russian victory with the taking of Vilnius.

Bogdanov rose to a major general in October 1798 and served as chef of the 8th Horse Artillery Regiment from 7 March 1800 to 27 August 1801 (in September 1801, Gregorian Calendar). He commanded the Russian Artillery Regiment at the Battle of Austerlitz in 1805. Later, he took his leave from the army and served as the civil governor of Tula from 1811 to 1814. Before the Battle of Borodino, Bogdanov was recalled to duty, and a new officer (Major General I. I. Miller) was  put in charge of the Tula's people's militia, also known as Narodnoe Opolcheniye.

He was already a lieutenant general (1807) and a member of the Privy Council (1808), and civil governor of Tula (1811) shortly before the Battle of Borodino. And during the fateful battle itself, he protected the right wing of the Russian Army, better known as the Raevsky Redoubt, winning the Order of St. George, 3rd degree.

He died in Moscow in 1829. He was 77.

Awards and decorations
 Order of St. George, 4th class (27 March 1795)
 Order of St. George, 3rd class (7 September 1812)

See also
 Nikolay Vuich
 Peter Ivanovich Ivelich
 Andrei Miloradovich
 Avram Ratkov
 Ivan Adamovich
 Ilya Duka
 Georgi Emmanuel
 Mikhail Miloradovich
 Semyon Zorich
 Peter Tekeli
 Ivan Lukačević (soldier)
 Jovan Šević
 Jovan Albanez
 Simeon Piščević
 Dejan Subotić
 Fedor Yakovlevich Mirkovich
 Anto Gvozdenović
 Jovan Horvat
 Marko Ivelich

References

External links
 Russian biography

1751 births
1829 deaths
Russian commanders of the Napoleonic Wars
Imperial Russian Army generals

Russia
Recipients of the Order of St. George of the Third Degree
Recipients of the Order of St. George of the Fourth Degree
Privy Councillor (Russian Empire)